Azza bint Sulaiman bin Saeed Al Ismaili is an Omani politician and entrepreneur who was appointed the position of Minister of Technology and Communications in the Government of the Sultanate of Oman, from October 2019 to August 2020.

Education 
Al Ismaili attended Sultan Qaboos University in the Sultanate of Oman where she received her bachelor's degree and then her master's degree in Computer Engineering. She then pursued
to obtain her master's degree in Executive Business Administration from Grand Canyon University.

Career 
In 1994, Al Ismaili joined Petroleum Development Oman, where she spent ten years, and held several positions, including the business development engineer and project manager.

She has served as an official for the Telecommunications Regulatory Authority, and as a member of the Advisory Council of the College of Education at Sultan Qaboos University, and participated in the General Education Development Committee in the Sultanate of Oman since 2015. In 2017, Al Ismaili was selected and invited by the government of Oman to join the Oman 2040 Vision Development Group, in the General Secretariat of the Supreme Council for Planning.

In 2019, She was appointed by Sultan Qaboos bin Said pursuant to Royal Decree No. 68/2019 as the first minister of the Ministry of Technology and Communications, which was established in the same year by Royal Decree No. 63/2019, and remained in the position until August 18, 2020.

References 

Year of birth missing (living people)
Living people
Government ministers of Oman
21st-century Omani women politicians
21st-century Omani politicians
Women government ministers of Oman
Sultan Qaboos University alumni